The Sun Awakens is the ninth album by experimental indie rock band, Six Organs of Admittance, released in 2006. Six Organs' frontman, Ben Chasny, composed all of the album's material. The album mixes influences of folk and indie rock. An eastern influence is most prominent on the final track, which includes drones, chants and a ney.

Track listing
"Torn by Wolves" – 1:42
"Bless Your Blood" – 5:57
"Black Wall" – 5:29
"The Desert Is a Circle" – 2:57
"Attar" – 2:53
"Wolves' Pup" – 1:50
"River of Transfiguration" – 23:50

References

2006 albums
Six Organs of Admittance albums
Drag City (record label) albums